Trường Tiền Bridge is a bridge crossing the Perfume River in Huế, Vietnam

Description
Spanning over the Perfume River, the northern bridgehead is in Dong Ba ward with the southern bridgehead is in Phu Hoi ward in the city center of Hue city, Thua Thien Hue province, Vietnam.

History
In 1897, French engineering company Eiffell was assigned by the French Resident Superior in Central Vietnam to design and build the bridge. This bridge was designed by the Schneider, Cie, and Letellier team from Eiffel.
The project was completed at an estimated cost of 732,456 Francs, with the groundbreaking ceremony taking place in May 1899 and the inauguration on December 18, 1900.

During the 1904 'Year of the Dragon' Flood ("Trận lụt năm Thìn"), the bridge sustained significant damage and would require significant repair.  The bridge would be re-opened in 1906 with the road paved in concrete rather than the wooden planks from before.

In 1907, when Thành Thái was exiled by the French to Réunion Island, the French colonial government renamed the bridge "Clémenceau Bridge", after Georges Clemenceau, a French Prime Minister during World War I.

 The upgrade cost 435,000 francs. 

On June 20, 1937, the Eiffel company (then named Anciens Etablissements Eiffel) led by engineer Martin André began construction on an expansion of the bridge.  In November 1939, after 29 months of construction, the bridge expansion was completed.

The bridge endured decades of severe damage, catastrophic collapses, and temporary repairs until a long-term rebuilding effort took place from 1991 to 1995.  Among the changes, the pedestrian balcony pathways were removed on both sides, the roads were narrowed to add two more railing pipes for bracing, and the paint color was changed to gray instead of the original silver. In 2002, colorful lights were permanently installed into the bridge for a festival.

Gallery

References

Bridges completed in 1900
Bridges in Vietnam